Protein ajuba is a protein that in humans is encoded by the JUB gene.

Function 

JUB proteins contribute to cell fate determination and regulate cell proliferation and differentiation. Plays an important role in regulation of the kinase activity of AURKA/Aurora-A for mitotic commitment.

Interactions 

JUB (gene) has been shown to interact with Stratifin and SLC1A2.

References

Further reading